Thunbergia bicolor, also known as the bicolour clock vine, is a species of flowering plant within the family Acanthaceae.

Distribution 
Thunbergia bicolor is endemic to Southwest India.

Habitat

References 

bicolor
Flora of India